Also see Sacred (video game) and Sacred 3, both having fictional town of the same name.

Mascarell is a village in Nules, Castelló, Spain.

External links 
 Mascarell in the Camino del Cid

References

Populated places in the Province of Castellón